
Gmina Skwierzyna is an urban-rural gmina (administrative district) in Międzyrzecz County, Lubusz Voivodeship, in western Poland.

Villages
Apart from the town of Skwierzyna, Gmina Skwierzyna contains the villages and settlements of Dobrojewo, Gościnowo, Jezierce, Kijewice, Krobielewko, Murzynowo, Murzynowo-Łomno, Nowy Dwór, Rakowo, Skrzynica, Świniary, Trzebiszewo, Warcin and Wiejce.

Neighbouring gminas
Gmina Skwierzyna is bordered by the gminas of Bledzew, Deszczno, Drezdenko, Międzychód, Przytoczna and Santok.

Twin towns – sister cities

Gmina Skwierzyna is twinned with:

 Bernau bei Berlin, Germany

 Durbe, Latvia
 Fredersdorf-Vogelsdorf, Germany
 Międzychód, Poland

References

Skwierzyna
Międzyrzecz County